This is the list of notable stars in the constellation Cancer. The 121 stars are sorted by decreasing brightness, beginning with Beta Cancri, the brightest star in Cancer.

See also
Lists of stars by constellation

References

Bibliography

List
Cancer